Teresa Chikaba (Ewe: Chicaba or Chicava; c. 1676 – 6 December 1748) was a Ghanaian princess, enslaved and later trafficked by a Spanish marchioness, declared venerable by the Catholic Church.

Biography
An account written by a priest in 1752, shortly after her death, is the primary source for her biography, based on his interviews with her and on her writings (no longer extant). Kidnapped at the age of nine, Teresa de Santo Domingo could recall only a few details of her life prior to enslavement.

She was born in the territory known to seventeenth- and eighteenth-century Spanish and Portuguese navigators as La Mina Baja del Oro, the part of West Africa that extends through present-day eastern Ghana, Togo, Benin, and western Nigeria. She was named Chicaba. The names of her parents suggest that her people were Ewe.

Chicaba was kidnapped by Spanish sailors and sold into slavery. She was sent to the island of São Tomé, where she was baptized and given the name Teresa. During her childhood she was exported to Spain. Perhaps her youth, her illness during the arduous first leg of the Middle Passage, or maybe her enslavers’ belief that the gold bangles (manacles) she wore were signs of her exalted social status convinced the traders that she might bring a special profit in the Spanish market.

Juliana Teresa Portocarrero y Meneses, then Duchess of Arcos and later the third wife of the 2nd Marquess of Mancera, purchased Teresa/Chicaba. The marquess had served as viceroy of New Spain and, during his tenure there, had been a protector of the writer and nun Juana Inés de la Cruz.

As a member of the retinue of this religious aristocratic household, the young slave habituated herself to the piousness of her mistress and developed an intense spiritual life that in time became her key to freedom. In addition, while with the marchioness, Teresa/Chicaba must have acquired the intellectual preparation that enabled her to undertake the customary projects of religious women of the period.

Despite or because of the favor the marchioness may have shown Teresa, the young woman was subject to cruelty and violence from the other staff.  The biography describes vicious beatings she received from the hands of the housekeeper and the intrusions into her relationship with her confessor by others in the household.

In accordance with the behest of her owner, who died in 1703, Teresa was free to enter the  Dominican convent of La Penitencia of the Third Order of Saint Mary Magdalene in Salamanca. She traveled to this convent, the only one to accept the black woman after several attempts on her behalf by the members of the household where she had been a slave. She took with her a handsome dowry (more than most nuns entering that community) and expected to be accepted as a member of the community in some official capacity, but was surprised or disappointed when the welcome was not as she expected. She was initially denied by the local bishop, who only granted her permission to work as a maid for the religious community. Some years later, he relented and she made final vows as a Dominican sister.  Though professed as a "white veiled" religious sister, her tasks in the community remained the same despite; she did menial labor and sometimes tended the sick. Race put her at a disadvantage in the highly stratified social hierarchy of monastic houses of the era.

Over time, Teresa gained recognition as a healer and a sister with prodigious religious gifts. The annuity bequeathed her in the marchioness’ will as well as donations from people who sought her prayers allowed her to gain ascendancy in the monastery among nuns who were only able to make their professions thanks to her financial help with their dowries.

Teresa died on 6 December 1748. She was known for the care she gave to the poor, sick and down-hearted. Her acts of charity, her mystical experiences, and her fame as a healer or miracle worker moved her order soon after her death to commission two portraits of her for purposes of local veneration. At the same time, they initiated the process for her beatification, for which the Theatine priest Paniagua wrote first a funeral oration (Oración fúnebre en las Exequias de la Madre Sor Teresa Juliana de Santo Domingo, de feliz memoria, celebradas en el día nueve de enero en el Convento de Religiosas Dominicas, vulgo de la Penitencia, Salamanca, 1749) and later the full-length hagiography, that has been published also in English. Paniagua's Vida reveals a Catholic piety joined with religious practices retained among some peoples of African descent. Her cause for canonisation is being pursued.

References

External links
 Melián, E. (2012). Chikaba, la primera monja negra en el sistema esclavista finisecular español del siglo XVII. (Chikaba, the First Black Nun in the Spanish Slavery System of the final Seventeenth Century). Hispania Sacra, 64(130): 565-581 doi: 

Venerated Catholics
Guinean Roman Catholics
1676 births
1748 deaths
Dominican nuns
18th-century venerated Christians
Place of birth unknown
Spanish slaves